The 2016 Rostelecom Cup was the third event of six in the 2016–17 ISU Grand Prix of Figure Skating, a senior-level international invitational competition series. It was held at the Megasport Arena in Moscow on November 4–5. Medals were awarded in the disciplines of men's singles, ladies' singles, pair skating, and ice dancing. 

Skaters earned points toward qualifying for the 2016–17 Grand Prix Final.

Entries
The ISU published the preliminary assignments on June 30, 2016.

Changes to preliminary assignments

Results

Men

Ladies

Pairs

Ice dancing

References

External links
 2016 Rostelecom Cup at the International Skating Union

Rostelecom Cup
Rostelecom Cup
Rostelecom Cup
Rostelecom Cup